The Longest Day may refer to:
 The "D-day" invasion of Normandy during World War II

Art, entertainment, and media
 The Longest Day (book), 1959 book by Cornelius Ryan
 The Longest Day (film), a 1962 war film based on Ryan's book
 Japan's Longest Day, a Japanese 1967 war film on the surrender of Japan in World War II
 The Longest Day (game), a 1980 wargame by Avalon Hill
 "The Longest Day" (Land of the Lost), an episode of the 1974 series Land of the Lost
 Longest Day (novel), a 1998 novel by Michael Collier set in the Doctor Who universe.
 "The Longest Day", a song by Iron Maiden from A Matter of Life and Death (2006)
 The Longest Day (album), 1984 album by the Del Fuegos

Other uses
 The Longest Day (race), a 24-hour sports and touring car endurance race
 "The longest day", a 25-hour day that occurs once a year due to daylight saving time
 The summer solstice, the "longest day" of the year since it has the most daylight

See also
 Long Day (disambiguation)